Habibganj railway station, officially Rani Kamalapati railway station (station code: RKMP), is a railway station in Bhopal City and part of the West Central Railway. It is located in Habibganj, New Bhopal and lies on the main Jhansi–Bhopal–Itarsi route line. It is India's first private railway station. In November 2021, the Madhya Pradesh Government changed its name from Habibganj railway station to Rani Kamalapati railway station in the memory of Gond queen Rani Kamlapati.

History 
The Ministry of Railways privatised Habibganj railway station in June 2017, making it India's first private railway station. The station will have facilities like a shopping complex, forex kiosk and eateries.

The rebuilt railway station was opened in November 2021 by Prime Minister Narendra Modi. The station code was changed from HBJ to RKMP.

Structure 
The station has 5 platforms.

Transport

By air
Raja Bhoj International Airport is located near the suburb of Sant Hirdaram Nagar (formerly known as Bairagarh) and is the primary airport serving the state of Madhya Pradesh, India. *As of January 2020, Bhopal has non-stop flights to New Delhi, Mumbai, Surat, Jaipur, Ahmedabad, Udaipur, Bangalore, Hyderabad, Pune and Raipur. There are no international flight from Bhopal.

By rail
Habibganj railway station lies on the main Jhansi–Bhopal–Itarsi route line. Bhopal Junction is the other major railway station in the area.

By road
The railway station of Habibganj is located :
  away from 
  away from Bhopal Central
  away from Maharana Pratap Nagar, Bhopal, the commercial area in southern region of the Bhopal city

Gallery

See also 
 Misrod
 Bairagarh

References

External links
 
 Site Photograph Habibganj railway station

Railway stations in Bhopal
Railway stations opened in 1979
Bhopal railway division
1979 establishments in Madhya Pradesh